Bob Franceschini (born 1961) is an American jazz saxophonist and instrumentalist, songwriter, and arranger. He has appeared on more than eighty albums including those of Mike Stern, Paul Simon, and Willie Colón.

Franceschini grew up in Manhattan and started playing music at a young age, he began playing professionally as early as 17-18 with Tito Puente and now tours worldwide with the Mike Stern Band, Willie Colón, Dennis Chambers and the Victor Wooten Trio, as well as many others. When not touring, Franceschini is a faculty member at Victor Wooten's Camp For Music and Nature  and co-hosts an annual saxophone retreat with Bob Reynolds and Bob Hemenger called the Inside:Outside Retreat for Saxophonists.

Biography

Career
Throughout his career, Franceschini has composed and arranged music for many artists including Tower of Power and Victor Wooten. Additionally, he has toured internationally and recorded with Mike Stern, Paul Simon, Celine Dion, Tito Puente, BeBe Winans, Ricky Martin, Lionel Richie, Eddie Palmieri, Victor Wooten as well as many others.

In 2001 Franceschini performed on Mike Stern's Grammy Nominated album Voices.

Select discography 
Co-leader
 Whole Lotta Love: The Music of Led Zeppelin with Orlando Le Fleming, Kevin Hays, Obed Calvaire (Chesky, 2021) – recorded in 2020

With Willie Colón
 Honra y Cultura (Sony Discos Inc.)
 Y vuelve otra vez (Madacy Latino)
 Hecho en Puerto Rico (Sony Music Distribution)
 Top Secret (Fania Special)

With Paul Simon
 Songs from The Capeman (Warner Elektra Atlantic Corp.)

With Celine Dion
 These Are Special Times (Epic)

With Mike Stern
 Who Let the Cats Out (Heads Up, 2006)
 New Morning: The Paris Concert (Inakustik, 2008)[DVD-Video]

References

External links
Official Website
[ Bob Franceschini] - on Allmusic
 Rafael Navarro Manufacturer of Bob's Franceschini Maestra mouthpiece
 Bob Franceschini is an exclusive endorser of Rafael Navarro Saxophone Mouthpieces
 Inside:Outside Saxophone Retreat

1961 births
American jazz saxophonists
American male saxophonists
Musicians from New York (state)
Living people
American people of Italian descent
21st-century American saxophonists
21st-century American male musicians
American male jazz musicians